"Only You" is a song by American electronic music trio Cheat Codes and British girl group Little Mix. It was released on June 22, 2018, as a single through Syco Music and 300 Entertainment. The single was written by Pablo Bowman, Trevor Dahl, Kevin Ford, Matthew Russell, Nicholas Gale Richard Boardman, and with production by Digital Farm Animals, with Maegan Cottone and Trevor Dahl. The song appears on the Ministry of Sound compilation album The Pool Party, as the eighteenth track on the deluxe edition of their fifth studio album LM5 and the acoustic version appears on the Japanese edition of the album.

Musically "Only You" is an edm track with elements of dance-pop. It was met with positive reviews from critics, with some citing it as one of the best summer songs of 2018. The songs lyrics is about missing a special someone in your life. A music video was later released and features a same sex couple with an LGBTQ+ themed storyline.

"Only You" reached the top ten in New Zealand and Hungary. The song peaked at number fifteen on the UK Singles Chart, and reached the charts in thirteen other territories including France, Ireland and Australia. It has since received two platinum and gold music certifications. Little Mix performed the song at the 2018 Jingle Bell Ball, BBC Teen Awards, and on tour, the most recent being The Confetti Tour in 2022.

Background
The song was written by Pablo Bowman, Nicholas Gale and Richard Boardman, with production by Digital Farm Animals, Maegan Cottone. The song was revealed in June 2018 with its inclusion on The Pool Party album, which accompanied the television series Love Island. Snippets of the song were teased by Cheat Codes and Little Mix prior to the song's release. Cheat Codes and Little Mix announced on Twitter that the song would be released on June 22, 2018. The song's picture cover was released a day later along with some leaked lyrics.

Composition
"Only You" is a midtempo EDM song, backed by an acoustic guitar, that runs for three-minutes and nine seconds. It includes elements of electronic, tropical house and ambient. It contains backing vocals by the members of Cheat Codes. All the lyrics are structured in verse–pre-chorus–chorus which contain no vocals but instead an instrumental. Lyrically it is about love and post-breakup phase of a relationship.

Music video 
The music video for the song was released on July 12, 2018, on Little Mix's official YouTube channel. The video features an LGBTQ+ storyline between two girls (played by Lisa Starrett and Peyton List) at a house party, one of whom turns out to be a mermaid. The video was directed by Frank Borin.

Synopsis

The plot shows a girl (played by Lisa), picking clothes for a party and it later shows her arriving and has trouble interacting with the others and she decides to sit on the couch. Meanwhile, a mysterious girl (played by Peyton) is seen hiding in the bushes and runs and takes a nearby yellow jacket and runs off and enters the party and Lisa and Peyton lock eyes and decide to dance and seen having fun together at the party, such as conversations, games and dancing. Then a group of other girls show up interrupting the two. One specific girl notices Peyton has her jacket. Angry, she pushes Peyton in the pool and she doesn't show up for a while. Worried, Lisa jumps in the pool to save her and find out she is okay and they kiss. It then shows the two kissing on the party while also showing the shocking discovery of Peyton being the mermaid. It then shows Lisa carrying Peyton to the ocean while also showing scenes of their greatest times and Lisa kneels on the beach sunrise where Peyton is, having to let her go.

Critical reception
MTV called the song a "pop-dance crossover" and a "sun-tinged tune". They also said that it was "so good" to finally have the girls back again. Rob Copsey from Official Charts said that it was a "pool party song" and that it is the correct song to add to the Love Island CD. Michael Ko from Billboard said: "It's most certainly a summer-made single, dripping in youthful romantic sentiments with an acoustic foundation".

Live performances 
The band made a televised debut of the song at 2018 BBC Radio 1's Teen Awards, where they also won the Best British Group award for a second year in a row.

Credits and personnel
Credits adapted from Tidal.
 
Personnel
 Electric – songwriter, producer, engineer, instruments, programming
 Pablo Bowman, Trevor Dahl, Nicholas Gale and Richard Boardman – songwriter
 Digital Farm Animals, Maegan Cottone and Trevor Dahl – producer
 Danny Casio – engineer
 Randy Merrill – mastering engineer
 Serban Ghenea, John Hanes – mix engineer

Charts

Weekly charts

Year-end charts

Certifications

Release history

References

2018 singles
2018 songs
Cheat Codes (DJs) songs
Little Mix songs
Music videos directed by Frank Borin
Songs written by Richard Boardman
Songs written by Pablo Bowman
Songs written by Digital Farm Animals
Song recordings produced by Digital Farm Animals